Afriki is the fourth studio album by Habib Koité & Bamada, published by Cumbancha & Contre-Jour

Track listing
All Songs Written By Habib Koite
 "Namania" 4:11
 "N'tesse" 4:33
 "Africa" 4:51
 "Fimani" 4:28
 "N'ba" 4:40
 "Mali Ba" 4:44
 "Barra" 3:48
 "N'Teri" 4:36
 "Nta Dima" 3:05
 "Massake" 3:53
 "Titati" 3:23

References

2007 albums